The Ernest F. Hollings ACE Basin National Wildlife Refuge is a  portion of the larger ACE Basin area, and the only portions that are federally protected. The wildlife refuge is divided into two units: the Edisto River unit and the Combahee River unit.

The following threatened or endangered species are present in the refuge: wood stork

External links
 Ernest F. Hollings ACE Basin NWR Website

Protected areas of Beaufort County, South Carolina
Protected areas of Charleston County, South Carolina
Protected areas of Colleton County, South Carolina
Protected areas of Hampton County, South Carolina
National Wildlife Refuges in South Carolina
Protected areas established in 1990
1990 establishments in South Carolina